Società Polisportiva Ars et Labor, commonly known as S.P.A.L., is a professional football club based in Ferrara, Emilia-Romagna, Italy. The team plays in Serie B, the second tier of the Italian football league system.

Founded in 1907, since 1928 they have played their home matches at Stadio Paolo Mazza, named after Paolo Mazza (chairman of the club 1946–1977).

In total, SPAL have participated in 24 top-tier, 28 second-tier, 41 third-tier, 7 fourth-tier and 1 fifth-tier league seasons. The club's best finish was when they came fifth in the 1959–60 Serie A; they also reached the 1961–62 Coppa Italia final.

The club is chaired by the American Joe Tacopina, the current manager is Massimo Oddo.

History

From foundation to World War II
The club was founded in March 1907 as Circolo Ars et Labor (Latin for Art and Work Club) by the Salesian priest Pietro Acerbis. In the early stages, it was mainly a cultural and religious association, then in 1913 it became a multi-sports company, taking the name of Società Polisportiva Ars et Labor (SPAL). The team began its professional activity under the aegis of the Italian Football Federation (Federazione Italiana Giuoco Calcio) in 1919, competing in the second-tier tournament.

SPAL played in the top flight league from 1920 to 1925, reaching the qualification playoff for the National Finals in 1921–22. From 1925 until the Second World War, they played in Serie B and Serie C: in this period, the club's all-time top striker Mario Romani scored 130 goals in 189 games during two different periods with the white-blues (1925–32 and 1937–38).

Between 1939 and 1943 the club temporarily changed its name to A.C. Ferrara, wearing the black and white colours of the city. After the suspension of the championships due to war, in 1945 the club returned to the name SPAL and to the light blue and white kits.

The golden period in Serie A

In 1946 Paolo Mazza became chairman of the club. After five consecutive seasons in Serie B, SPAL won promotion to Serie A after finishing the championship first in 1950–51. The white-blues subsequently stayed in the top division for most of the 1950s and 1960s, competing in 16 out of 17 Serie A seasons from 1951 to 1968.

SPAL finished fifth in 1959–60, thus obtaining the best finish in its history. Also, in 1961–62 they played in the Coppa Italia final, losing against Napoli. In the early stages of 1962–63 season, in which the club finished in eighth place, the white and blues managed to reach the top of the league table. During those years, the club was a launchpad for many young players who became stars, among them Fabio Capello.

In 1963–64 they were relegated to Serie B, but they came back to Serie A after only one year, and remained in the top division until 1968. At the end of the last season in the top flight, SPAL won the Cup of Italian-Swiss Friendship.

From 1970s to 21st century
During 1970s, 1980s and 1990s SPAL played mostly in Serie B and Serie C/C1.

Paolo Mazza quit the presidency in December 1976 and was replaced by Primo Mazzanti. The former chairman died in December 1981 and three months later Ferrara's Stadio Comunale was named after him.

In 1990, Giovanni Donigaglia became chairman of the club: between 1990 and 1992 SPAL obtained back-to-back promotions from Serie C2 to Serie B, under the management of Giovan Battista Fabbri. Donigaglia left the presidency in 2002 with the squad in Serie C1. He was replaced by Lino di Nardo.

Recent years 

The club went bankrupt in 2005, and were reformed as SPAL 1907 S.r.l., under the terms of Article 52 of N.O.I.F. In the summer of 2012, after suffering a second bankruptcy, the club was refounded for the second time as S.S.D. Real SPAL and would begin life in Serie D under the same N.O.I.F. article.

At the end of the 2012–13 season the club took back its original name. Giacomense, a club founded in 1967 at Masi San Giacomo, a frazione of Masi Torello, had moved to the city of Ferrara; on 12 July 2013, owner Roberto Benasciutti made a deal with the Colombarini family for a merger between SPAL and Giacomense, with the latter giving its sports title to SPAL and continuing to play in Ferrara. The club changed its name to S.P.A.L. 2013, in order to continue the football history of SPAL. Walter Mattioli became president, with Simone and Francesco Colombarini as main shareholders.

They finished the 2013–14 Lega Pro Seconda Divisione season in sixth place, thus qualifying for the inaugural unified 2014–15 Lega Pro season. In 2015–16, the squad won promotion to Serie B for the first time since the 1992–93 season, after finishing first in group B of the Lega Pro. The following year they came first in Serie B, thus obtaining promotion to Serie A after a 49-year absence. In their first season back in Serie A, SPAL avoided relegation by finishing in 17th place. At the end of the 2018–19 season they confirmed their presence in the top flight for a third consecutive year, finishing 13th. The club had mixed fortunes in the 2019–2020 season and, after gaining just 15 points in 23 games, coach Leonardo Semplici was dismissed in February 2020, replaced by Luigi Di Biagio. SPAL were relegated to Serie B, finishing in last place with 20 points. The club reached the 2020–21 Coppa Italia quarter-finals, becoming the only team from Serie B to advance to that stage in the competition.

In August 2021 the club was acquired by the American lawyer and businessman Joe Tacopina.

Colours, badge and nicknames
The team's colours are light blue and white, which derive from the Salesians' emblem. The home kit, since 1962, has been composed of a vertical striped light blue-white shirt, white trainers and white socks. The only exception to light blue and white was when the club adopted a black and white kit between 1939 and 1943 (when it was named A.C. Ferrara), in honour of Ferrara's civic colours.

Currently the badge features an oval-shaped light blue escutcheon, with a white band in the upper section, on which is written the acronym S.P.A.L. in golden characters. Also, in the lower section, the black and white emblem of the city is featured. From 1980 until mid-1990s the official badge featured a fawn, another symbol of the club.

SPAL's most common nicknames are Biancazzurri (from the club colours, light blue and white) and Estensi (from the House of Este, ancient European noble dynasty that ruled Ferrara from 1240 to 1597).

Stadium

 Campo di Piazza d'Armi (1919–28)
 Stadio Paolo Mazza (1928–)

The current home ground of SPAL is the 16,134 seater Stadio Paolo Mazza. The stadium was opened in September 1928 as Stadio Comunale, then took on its current name in February 1982, in honour of the former president of the club Paolo Mazza, who died two months earlier.

Initially it had a capacity of 4,000. Then, in concomitance with the promotion of SPAL to Serie A, in 1951 it was subjected to a heavy restructuring that brought capacity to 25,000. Between 1960s and 1980s it was renovated again, reducing the number of possible spectators to 22,000 until the mid-2000s.

From 2005 to 2016 the stadium capacity was limited to 7,500 due to safety reasons and cost containment. In 2016–17, after the club's promotion to Serie B and then to Serie A, the stadium was restructured again to match the modern needs of comfort and safety. In the summer of 2018 a further remodeling took place, in order to bring the total capacity from 13,135 seats to 16,134.

Sponsors

Kit sponsors 
 1981–86: Adidas
 1986–87: Meyba
 1987–89: Fitness
 1989–91: WBS
 1991–04: Asics
 2004–05: Zeus
 2005–09: Legea
 2009–10: Asics
 2010–12: Givova
 2012–13: Legea
 2013–16: Erreà
 2016–17: HS Football
 2017–23: Macron

Official sponsors 
 1981–82: Sauber
 1982–89: Cassa di Risparmio di Ferrara
 1989–90: Cassa di Risparmio di Ferrara, Ravani Acciai
 1990–05: Cassa di Risparmio di Ferrara
 2005–08: Cassa di Risparmio di Ferrara, Tomasi Case
 2008–09: Cassa di Risparmio di Ferrara
 2009–10: Cassa di Risparmio di Ferrara, Lega del Filo d'Oro
 2010–11: Cassa di Risparmio di Ferrara, Trasea
 2011–13: Cassa di Risparmio di Ferrara
 2013–15: Vetroresina, Veneto Banca
 2015–16: Vetroresina, Reale Mutua, BMW ErreEffe Group
 2016–17: Vetroresina, Magnadyne, 958 Santero, BMW ErreEffe Group
 2017–18: InterSpar, Tassi Group, BMW ErreEffe Group
 2018–19: Tassi Group, BMW ErreEffe Group, Pentaferte
 2019–20: Omega Group, Krifi Caffè, OrOil, VB Impianti, Errebi Technology, Pentaferte
 2020–21: Omega Group, Adamant BioNRG, Errebi Technology, Pentaferte
 2021–22: Adamant BioNRG, Omega Group, Golden Group, Errebi Technology
 2022–23: Adamant BioNRG, Errebi Technology, Iosco Group, EdilAlba

Players

Current squad

Out on loan

Notable former players

 Mirco Antenucci
 Mario Astorri
 Osvaldo Bagnoli
 Gastone Bean
 Savino Bellini
 Etrit Berisha
 Niels Bennike
 Ottavio Bianchi
 Alberto Bigon
 Kevin Bonifazi
 Marco Borriello
 Gianfranco Bozzao
 Ottavio Bugatti
 Ruben Buriani
 Fabio Capello
 Lucas Castro
 Sergio Cervato
 Giacomo Cipriani
 Dante Crippa
 Carlo Dell'Omodarme
 Luigi Delneri
 Federico Di Francesco
 Beniamino Di Giacomo
 Dan Ekner
 Bülent Esel
 Salvatore Esposito
 Felipe Dal Bello
 Mohamed Fares
 Matteo Ferrari
 Sergio Floccari
 Adolfo Gori
 Matthew Kemp
 Jasmin Kurtić
 Manuel Lazzari
 Saul Malatrasi
 Marco Mancosu
 Thomas Manfredini
 Carlo Mazzone
 Alex Meret
 Simone Missiroli
 Egidio Morbello
 Marco Nappi
 Fulvio Nesti
 Oscar Massei
 Dante Micheli
 Alberto Paloschi
 Egisto Pandolfini
 Michele Paramatti
 Fausto Pari
 Luigi Pasetti
 Sergio Pellissier
 Andrea Petagna
 Armando Picchi
 Gennaro Olivieri
 Alberto Orlando
 Dion Ørnvold
 Edoardo Reja
 Mario Romani
 Nils-Åke Sandell
 Andy Selva
 David Sesa
 Abdon Sgarbi
 Mirko Valdifiori
 Carl Valeri
 Mattia Valoti
 Stefano Vecchi
 Francesco Vicari
 Federico Viviani
 Emiliano Viviano
 Erwin Waldner
 Franco Zaglio

Captains
Below a chronological list of SPAL captains since 1950.

Technical staff

Chairmen history
SPAL have had several presidents (chairmen) ( or ) over the course of their history. Some of them have been the main shareholder of the club. The longest-serving is Paolo Mazza.

Managerial history

SPAL have had many managers and head coaches throughout their history, below is a chronological list of them.

Club records

League
Below is a table showing the participation of SPAL in the Italian football leagues.

Individual

Honours

Domestic

League titles
 Serie B
 Winners (2): 1950–51, 2016–17
 Serie C / Serie C1 / Lega Pro
 Winners (5): 1937–38, 1972–73, 1977–78, 1991–92, 2015–16
 Runners-up (5): 1941–42, 1942–43, 1969–70, 1970–71, 1995–96
 Serie C2
 Winners (1): 1997–98
 Runners-up (1): 1990–91

Cups
 Coppa Italia
 Runners-up (1): 1961–62
 Coppa Italia Serie C
 Winners (1): 1998–99
 Runners-up (1): 1988–89
 Supercoppa di Serie C / Lega Pro
 Winners (1): 2016

European
 Cup of Italian-Swiss Friendship
 Winners (1): 1968

Youth
 Campionato Primavera Serie B
 Winners (1): 1964–65

 Campionato De Martino Serie A
 Winners (1): 1967–68

 Campionato Nazionale Under-18
 Winners (1): 2021–22

References

External links
Official Site

 
Football clubs in Italy
Football clubs in Emilia-Romagna
Association football clubs established in 1907
Italian football First Division clubs
Serie A clubs
Serie B clubs
Serie C clubs
Serie D clubs
1907 establishments in Italy
Phoenix clubs (association football)
2005 establishments in Italy
2012 establishments in Italy
Coppa Italia Serie C winning clubs